There are two species of snake named Ethiopian house snake:

 Abyssinian house snake, Pseudoboodon abyssinicus
Bofa erlangeri